That's Harakiri is the debut studio album by Milwaukee electronic music producer Sd Laika, released on the label Tri Angle in 2014.

Critical reception 

In terms of publication reception, That's Harakiri was positively received and landed in the top 40 of the year-end lists of best albums by Crack Magazine (#27) and Fact (#36). These magazines plus other sources spotlighted the blends of menacing, gracious, and humorous tones, with Crack praising its mixture of a dark grime style with "heavily-grooved, twisted melodies that are at times arresting and at others wistful and longing."

Track listing
All tracks written by Sd Laika.

References 

2014 debut albums
Electronic albums by American artists